Chandler is a city in Maricopa County, Arizona, United States, and a suburb in the Phoenix-Mesa-Chandler Metropolitan Statistical Area (MSA). It is bordered to the north and west by Tempe, to the north by Mesa, to the west by Phoenix, to the south by the Gila River Indian Community, and to the east by Gilbert. As of the 2020 census, the population of Chandler was 275,987, up from 236,123 at the 2010 census.

History 
In 1891, Dr. Alexander John Chandler, the first veterinary surgeon in Arizona Territory, settled on a ranch south of Mesa and studied irrigation engineering. By 1900, he had acquired  of land and began drawing up plans for a townsite on what was then known as the Chandler Ranch. The townsite office opened on May 16, 1912.

(Soon after celebrating Chandler's Centennial on May 17, 2012, Chandler Museum staff discovered that the city had been celebrating the wrong date. In May 1912, the Chandler Arizonan newspaper had erroneously published the founding day as May 17, and through the years residents had misremembered the correct date, which was Thursday, May 16, 1912.)

The original townsite was bounded by Galveston Street on the north, Frye Road on the south, Hartford Street on the west, and Hamilton Street on the east. By 1913, a town center had become established, featuring the Hotel San Marcos, which also had the first grass golf course in the state. Chandler High School was established in 1914. Chandler incorporated on February 16, 1920, after 186 residents petitioned the Maricopa County Board of Supervisors to approve incorporation. Town founder A.J. Chandler was chosen as the president of the first town council and the town's first mayor.

Most of Chandler's economy was sustained during the Great Depression (though the Depression was to blame for the cancellation of a second San Marcos hotel), but the cotton crash a few years later had a much deeper impact on the city's residents. Later, the founding of Williams Air Force Base in 1941 led to a small surge in population, but Chandler still only held 3,800 people by 1950. By 1980, it had grown to 30,000, and it has since paced the Phoenix metropolitan area's high rate of growth, with suburban residential areas swallowing former agricultural plots. Some of this growth was fueled by the establishment of manufacturing plants for communications and computing firms such as Microchip, Motorola and Intel.

Since the early 1990s, the city of Chandler has experienced exponential growth, ranking among the fastest-growing municipalities in the country. The population had grown to more than 275,000 residents in more than 100,000 homes as of 2020. The heart of Chandler remains its revitalized historic downtown, which includes the Chandler City Hall and the Chandler Center for the Arts. In 2010, Chandler was named an All-America City by the National Civic League. Chandler was the only Arizona winner for the 61st annual awards.

Geography 

Chandler has reached its physical limits save for some remaining county islands and cannot expand outward anymore due to being bound in by the Gila River Indian Community, Tempe, Mesa, Gilbert, and Phoenix.

Climate

Demographics 

At the time of the 2010 Census, there were 236,123 people, 86,924 households, and 60,212 families in the city. The racial makeup of the city was 73.3% White, 4.8% Black or African American, 1.5% Native American, 8.2% Asian, 0.2% Pacific Islander, and 8.3% of other races. 21.9% of the population was Hispanic or Latino of any race.

There were 62,377 households, out of which 41.1% had children under the age of 18 living with them, 57.5% were married couples living together, 10.5% had a female householder with no husband present, and 27.2% were non-families. Of all households 19.3% were made up of individuals, and 3.6% had someone living alone who was 65 years of age or older. The average household size was 2.82 and the average family size was 3.26.

In the city, the population was spread out, with 29.8% under the age of 18, 8.6% from 18 to 24, 38.0% from 25 to 44, 17.8% from 45 to 64, and 5.8% who were 65 years of age or older. The median age was 31 years. For every 100 females, there were 99.7 males. For every 100 females age 18 and over, there were 96.9 males.

There were 101,229 housing units as of May 2016. The median income for a household in the city was $70,456, and the median income for a family was $81,720. Males had a median income of $44,578 versus $31,763 for females. The per capita income for the city was $23,904. About 4.6% of families and 6.6% of the population were below the poverty line, including 7.7% of those under age 18 and 8.0% of those age 65 or over.

Economy 
Computer chip manufacturer Intel has an influential role in city growth strategies with four locations in the municipal area, including its first factory to be designated "environmentally sustainable" under current Leadership in Energy and Environmental Design (LEED) criteria. Other high-technology manufacturing firms have partnerships with the local government, their operations employing approximately 25% of non-government workers in 2007. Although per capita employment growth in the sector has been in decline in Arizona since 2000, semiconductor and other electronic component manufacturing was largely unaffected; a series of customized grants for the training of net new employees, incorporating the Phoenix urbanized area (27,000 workers now commute to work in other communities), resulted in a larger market share of (Californian) industry. 

Since 2003, more than 2,900 jobs and investments totalling $3 billion have been created along the Price and Santan freeways, in the Price Road Corridor. Three shopping malls provide a "strong attraction" to such an open-ended, high exposure trade area: the  Chandler Fashion Center, opened in 2001, has spurred on several courts and laneway developments. In the southern end of the Corridor, Wal-Mart is expected to draw business from as far south as Hunt Highway, bringing with it a "large consumer population" which will improve "the image and perception of the area" in the mindset of many Greater Phoenix residents and state commercial retailers. The northern portion is "attractive and possesses the historic character" for success, which "can be grown to the south".

Companies headquartered in Chandler include Infusionsoft, Microchip, and Rogers. Bashas' headquarters is in a county island surrounded by Chandler.

Top employers 
According to the City of Chandler's website leading employers in the city include:

Culture 

Chandler is noted for its annual Ostrich Festival. Initially, agriculture was the primary business in Chandler, based on cotton, corn, and alfalfa. During the 1910s, there were ostrich farms in the area, catering to the demand for plumes used in women's hats of the era. This demand ebbed with the increasing popularity of the automobile, but the legacy of the ostrich farms would be commemorated by the Ostrich Festival. The Chandler Center for the Arts, a 1,500-seat regional performing arts venue and the Vision Gallery, a non-profit fine arts gallery representing over 300 regional artists in the Chandler area are downtown, and the Arizona Railway Museum is at Tumbleweed Park. A  Holocaust and Tolerance Museum has been slated for construction in Chandler.

There are numerous properties in the town of Chandler which are considered to be historical and have been included either in the National Register of Historic Places or listed as such by the Chandler Historical Society. The Historic McCullough-Price House, a 1938 Pueblo Revival-style home, was donated to the city by the Price-Propstra family in 2001. The city renovated and opened it to the public in 2007. On June 12, 2009, the McCullough-Price House was added to the National Register of Historic Places, the official listing of America's historic and cultural resources worthy of preservation. The city of Chandler operates the facility, which is southwest of Chandler Fashion Center at 300 S. Chandler Village Dr.

Parks and recreation 

On May 18, 2016, a national nonprofit parks and recreation advocacy organization based in Washington, D.C., announced that Chandler was a 2016 Playful City USA community, marking the tenth consecutive year the city earned the distinction (one of twelve founding U.S. cities to receive the honor for the tenth consecutive year since the program was initiated in 2007). Chandler was recognized for taking an innovative approach to making play a priority throughout the city with its many recreational amenities, parks and aquatic centers.

Community Services Department 
The Chandler Community Services Department serves residents and visitors in a variety of ways by providing recreation, fitness, cultural, artistic and educational opportunities along with classes, programs and special events. The Community Services Department, in Old Downtown Chandler, operates the community center, senior center, dozens of local neighborhood and community parks, two recreation centers and six aquatic centers.

Chandler's recreational offerings provide residents and visitors of all ages, interests and abilities with the facilities to participate in many sports, activities and special events. The Department publishes a quarterly recreation magazine called Break Time that is distributed free at many City facilities and through a free subscription service to residents.

A sampling of programs available through the Community Services Department and its Parks and Recreation Divisions includes: swim lessons; junior tennis clinics and leagues; youth classes and programs; youth sports; after-school teen programs; summer youth sports camps and arts camps; fitness classes; group aerobics and dance classes; nature and sustainable living courses; adult classes, sports leagues and outdoor recreation programs; active adult activities; therapeutic recreation special events and Special Olympics fundraising programs.

Chandler's regional Tumbleweed Park hosts a variety of events throughout the year, including the annual Ostrich Festival, the Fourth of July Fireworks Festival and the sixth annual Day of Play, attended by more than 5,000 people, was held on Saturday, October 27, 2012, at, Tumbleweed Park.

Government 

Chandler is represented by a mayor, a vice mayor and five city council members. The vice mayor is elected by the city council from among its members. The mayor, vice mayor and council members represent the entire city and are not elected from districts or wards.

Mayor: Kevin Hartke
Vice Mayor: Terry Roe
Council Members

 Christine Ellis
 OD Harris
 Mark Stewart
 Matt Orlando
 Rene Lopez

Education

Elementary and secondary 

Most of Chandler is served by the Chandler Unified School District. The area west of Loop 101 is served by the Kyrene Elementary School District and the Tempe Union High School District. The area east of Loop 101 and north of Warner Road is served by Mesa Public Schools. The San Vincente neighborhood in Chandler is served by Gilbert Public Schools.

Education alternatives include charter schools, Christian schools, parochial schools, magnet schools, as well as "traditional" academies. The leading charter schools in Chandler are Basis Schools and Legacy Traditional School.

Post-secondary 
The two-year Chandler-Gilbert Community College, serving 13,000 students, is in the east of the city near the Gilbert border. Private educational institutions Western International University and Apollo Group subsidiary University of Phoenix have locations here. International Baptist College is in Chandler. Ottawa University began offering adult education programs in Chandler in 1977. Chandler University opened in 2011.

Chandler Public Library 
The Chandler Public Library serves Chandler and the greater Phoenix East Valley. The main library is in downtown Chandler, with three branches elsewhere in the city: Sunset, Basha (shared with Basha High School), and Hamilton (shared with Hamilton High School).

As part of a family literacy project to encourage literacy and library use among families who live in public housing, the Chandler Public Library visited four public housing locations to offer a four-week series of programs at each.

Radio and television licenses 
Chandler has only one radio license: KMLE.

Transportation

Addressing 

Most incorporated portions of Chandler, along with other East Valley cities Gilbert, Mesa, and Tempe, have their own addressing system distinct from the city of Phoenix and Maricopa County. The north–south meridian is Arizona Avenue, also known as State Route 87. Commonwealth Avenue, two blocks south of Chandler Boulevard, is the east–west baseline. With the significant exception of the stretch of the city from Chandler Boulevard to Ray Road, address numbers follow in mile-long increments of 1000 along the grid. Modern remnants of county addressing (which corresponds to the city of Phoenix system) from the city's rural agrarian days can be found in some neighborhood street names (90th place, 132nd Street) and county islands surrounded by the city proper.

Airports 

Chandler Municipal Airport is a two-runway general aviation facility in the heart of the city south of Loop 202. Gila River Memorial Airport in the Gila River Indian Community may serve the city in the future. In western Chandler, Stellar Airpark is a privately owned airport that is open to the public. The nearest commercial airport to downtown Chandler is Phoenix-Mesa Gateway Airport. For international and regional travel, most area residents continue to use Phoenix Sky Harbor International Airport,  from downtown Chandler.

City bus 

Chandler has very limited bus service compared with other Valley Metro cities of similar size; it currently ranks sixth in total ridership behind Phoenix, Tempe, Mesa, Scottsdale, and Glendale. Most local routes dead-end a few miles from the city or have further limited service within its borders. Currently, two express bus routes leave from the city near downtown, and a new park and ride facility was completed further south. Faced with increasing congestion, the land-locked city is pursuing transportation alternatives, including enhancement of the local bus system. This goal has partially been achieved through Proposition 400, which converts transit funding from city-based to county-based. The result has been increased frequencies on routes 72, 81, 96 (since July 28, 2008), 112, and 156, as well as Sunday bus service on the 72, 112, and 156. However, other routes have yet to be converted to "supergrid" status.

Freeways 

Chandler is served by three limited access highways:
 Loop 202, the Santan Freeway, completed through the city in 2006, cuts through the midsection of the city along the Pecos Road alignment.
 Loop 101, the Price Freeway, was completed in 2001, dividing West Chandler from the rest of the city. A majority of the city's employment, over 10,000 people as of 2007, are along the city's Price Road Corridor. Air Products' industrial pipelines along the corridor are unique to the metropolitan area. South of Pecos, the freeway borders the Gila River Indian Community.
 Interstate 10 is the city's westernmost border, and is on the other side is the Phoenix neighborhood of Ahwatukee.

Railroads

Heavy rail 
Chandler is served by two single-track branch lines of the Union Pacific Railroad. One generally traverses the Kyrene Road alignment and currently dead-ends at the Lone Butte Industrial Park. The other runs east of Arizona Avenue and dead-ends near Sacaton, Arizona. Commuter rail service on these lines is under study .

Light rail 
No light rail lines have been approved in the city, although high-capacity corridors including light rail have been identified in other regional and local plans. City officials joined the regional light rail authority, Valley Metro Rail, in 2007, expecting service perhaps in 2020. Potential high capacity transit corridors that have been identified in the past include Rural Road, Arizona Avenue, and Chandler Boulevard. The Chandler General Plan 2016 does not authorize light rail or any form of high capacity transit. A separate process for any consideration of light rail as the mode of transit may occur in the years to come. The language in the General Plan 2016 is to identify that options remain available in the future for the city as it continues analyzing transit within the high-capacity transit corridors.

Healthcare
The public hospital system, Valleywise Health (formerly Maricopa Integrated Health System), operates Valleywise Community Health Center – Chandler. Its sole hospital, Valleywise Health Medical Center, is in Phoenix.

Notable people 

 Ryan Bader, MMA fighter
 Cody Bellinger, MLB player for the Chicago Cubs
 Hunter Bishop (born 1998), baseball player
 Jakob Butturff, professional ten-pin bowler
 Zora Folley, professional heavyweight boxer
Austin Hollins (born 1991), basketball player for Maccabi Tel Aviv of the Israeli Basketball Premier League 
 Markus Howard, Marquette all-time leading basketball scorer
 Cameron Jordan, football player for the New Orleans Saints
 Shawn Michaels, professional wrestler and WWE Hall of Famer
 Patrick Murphy, MLB pitcher for the Toronto Blue Jays
 James Rallison (TheOdd1sOut), YouTube animator

Sister cities 
Chandler has two sister cities:
 Tullamore, County Offaly, Ireland – since 2008
 Tainan, Taiwan

Gallery of historic properties

Governmental representation

Federal 
The north central section of the city and the western "leg" of the city are within Arizona's 9th congressional district, served by Representative Greg Stanton, a Democrat. The rest of Chandler is within Arizona's 5th congressional district, served by Representative Andy Biggs, a Republican.

State 
Chandler's western "leg" and a small, narrow portion of the adjacent northern part of the city are within Arizona's 18th Legislative District, served by Representatives Denise Epstein and Jennifer Jermaine, and Senator Sean Bowie, all Democrats. The rest of the city is in Arizona's 17th Legislative District, served by Representatives Jennifer Pawlik and Jeff Weninger, and Senator J. D. Mesnard, one Democrat and two Republicans.

See also 

 Pueblo de Los Muertos
 Wild Horse Pass Motorsports Park

References

External links 

 
 Visit Chandler, official City of Chandler tourism website

 
Phoenix metropolitan area
Cities in Maricopa County, Arizona
Cities in Arizona
Populated places established in 1912
Company towns in Arizona
Populated places in the Sonoran Desert
1912 establishments in Arizona